Douglas Amador is a paralympic athlete from Brazil competing mainly in category T37 sprint and F37 long jump events.

Douglas competed at the 1996 Summer Paralympics in Sydney and won silver in the 200m, bronze in the 100m and bronze in the long jump.  Four years later in 2000 he competed as part of the bronze medal-winning Brazilian seven-a-side football team.

References

External links
 

Paralympic athletes of Brazil
Athletes (track and field) at the 1996 Summer Paralympics
Paralympic silver medalists for Brazil
Paralympic bronze medalists for Brazil
Brazilian footballers
Brazilian male sprinters
Brazilian male long jumpers
Living people
Medalists at the 1996 Summer Paralympics
Medalists at the 2000 Summer Paralympics
7-a-side footballers at the 2000 Summer Paralympics
Paralympic 7-a-side football players of Brazil
Association footballers not categorized by position
Year of birth missing (living people)
Paralympic medalists in athletics (track and field)
20th-century Brazilian people
21st-century Brazilian people